Mozeza Ashraf Monalisa (born October 5, 1984; known as Monalisa) is a retired Bangladeshi actress, model and dancer. She started her career by appearing in television commercials and stage dancing. She subsequently won Miss Photogenic 2000. She played in several television series and telefilms and is a trained dancer.

Career
Monalisa started acting, stage dancing and modeling at age 10. Beginning as a dancer, Monalisa became popular for her appearances in television commercials. She later acted in television plays including Boyosh Jokhon Ekhush, Kagojer Phool and Humayun Ahmed's Trishna. Among many other brands, Monalisa is the brand ambassador of BanglaLink Telecommunication.

Personal life
Monalisa married Faiaz Sharif in 2012. The couple then moved New York, and ended up in divorce after two years.

As of August 2018, Monalisa has been residing in the United States where she works as a beauty adviser in Sephora. Previously, she worked at MAC Cosmetics and KIKO Milano.

Television 
 Baazi (2011)
 Ektu Bhalobasha (2011)
 Bandulum (2011)
 Romeora (2011)
 All Rounder (2011)
 Bhalo Theko Ful Mishti Bokul (2011)
 Champakoli (2012)
 Sikander Box Ekhon Birat Model (2012)
 Average Aslam (2016)
 Kid Solaiman (2016)
 Chirkutt (2016)
 Mr.Perfectionist (2016)
 Antorjatik Mama (2016)
 Finix Fly (2016)
 Ami Tumi O She (2016)

Awards
 Miss Photogenic 2000 Bangladesh
 BIMA Award UK
 Channel i Performance Award
 Meril Prothom Alo Awards (2002)
 Dhallywood Award USA
 Bangladesh Reporters' Association Award

References

External links
 

Living people
1987 births
People from Dhaka
Bangladeshi film actresses
Bangladeshi television actresses
21st-century Bangladeshi actresses
20th-century Bangladeshi actresses